Marthea is a genus of green algae in the family Characiaceae.

References

Sphaeropleales genera
Sphaeropleales